William Ball may refer to:

 William Ball (MP) ( 1571), MP for Nottingham
 William Ball (astronomer) (1627–1690), English astronomer
 William Lee Ball (1781–1824), Virginia congressman
 William Ball (Shropshire Giant) (1795–1852), 40 stone iron puddler
 William Ball (Michigan politician) (1830–1902), Lieutenant Governor of Michigan, USA, 1889
 William Ball (footballer) (1886–1942), English footballer
 William Macmahon Ball (1901–1986), Australian academic and diplomat
 William Ball (skier) (1908–1979), Canadian skier and Olympic competitor
 William Bentley Ball (1916–1999), American constitutional lawyer
 William Ball (director) (1931–1991), American stage director
 William L. Ball (born 1948), American, former US Navy Secretary